Where I Wanna Be may refer to:

 Where I Wanna Be (Cravin' Melon album), 1995
 Where I Wanna Be (Donell Jones album), 1999
 "Where I Wanna Be" (Donell Jones song)
 "Where I Wanna Be" (Shade Sheist song), 2000
 Where I Wanna Be (V*Enna album), by V*Enna, 2000
 Where I Wanna Be (Nathan Carter album), 2013
 "Where I Wanna Be", a song by Eric Church from his 2021 album Heart & Soul